The 2019 Wan Chai District Council election was held on 24 November 2019 to elect all 15 members to the Wan Chai District Council.

The Kickstart Wan Chai, a pro-democracy local political group led by Claris Yeung Suet-ying, incumbent District Councillor of Tai Hang and consisting of a group of young fresh faces ran under the banner of independent and scored the most seats, while the Democratic Alliance for the Betterment and Progress of Hong Kong lost all its seats in the district.

Overall election results

Change in composition:

References

2019 Hong Kong local elections
Wan Chai District Council elections